The 2010 World Junior Baseball Championship was an international baseball competition being held at the Port Arthur Stadium and Central Ball Park in Thunder Bay, Ontario, Canada from July 23 to August 1, 2010.

Teams
Just before the tournament started on July 23, the organization had to announce that the team from Venezuela would not attend the tournament. However, on the second day of the tournament it was announced that Venezuela has joined the other 11 nations. The original schedule remained in place, and Venezuela forfeited its first scheduled game on July 23, giving a 9–0 win to Australia. That game will not be made up.

The following 12 teams qualified for the tournament.

Preliminaries

Pool A

Standings

Schedule

Pool B

Standings

Schedule

Playoffs

11th place game

9th place game

Finals

Quarterfinals

Losers Semifinals

Semifinals

7th place game

5th place game

Bronze medal game

Gold medal game

Final standings

Awards 
Following the final, the IBAF World Juniors Baseball Championship Technical Commission announced the All-IBAF 2010 World Juniors Baseball Championship Team. Only pool games were used to determine the players selected.

External links
Official Website
Official Website Host
Schedule and Results

References

World Junior Baseball Championship
U-18 Baseball World Cup
2010
World Junior Baseball Championship
World Junior Baseball Championship
Sports competitions in Thunder Bay
Baseball in Ontario
2010 in Ontario